William H. Cox Jr. (born July 15, 1942) is an American politician from Maryland. He served in the Maryland House of Delegates from 1971 to 1990.

Early life
William H. Cox Jr. was born on July 15, 1942, in Edgewood, Maryland. He attended Harford County Public Schools and the University of Baltimore.

Career
Cox is a Democrat. Cox served in the Maryland House of Delegates, representing Harford County, from 1971 to 1974. He continued serving from 1975 to 1982, representing District 6. He continued serving from 1983 to 1990, representing District 34. He was a member of the Ways and Means Committee. He served as the deputy majority whip from 1977 to 1983 and the deputy majority floor leader from 1983 to 1990.

Cox is a real estate broker and developer. He is a member of the board of directors of Fallston General Hospital.

Personal life
Cox is married with two children.

References

1942 births
Living people
People from Edgewood, Maryland
Democratic Party members of the Maryland House of Delegates
American real estate brokers
American real estate businesspeople